El Habib Bouguelmouna (born 12 December 1988 in Relizane) is an Algerian footballer who plays for ES Sétif as a forward.

International career
Bouguelmouna made his senior debut with the Algeria national football team in a friendly 2-0 loss to Saudi Arabia on 9 May 2018.

Honours

Club
USM Bel Abbès
 Algerian Cup: 2018

References

External links

1988 births
People from Relizane
Living people
Association football forwards
Algerian footballers
Algeria international footballers
Algerian Ligue Professionnelle 1 players
ES Sétif players
JS Saoura players
Paradou AC players
RC Relizane players
USM El Harrach players
USM Bel Abbès players
21st-century Algerian people